The Curuçá River is a river in the state of Pará, Brazil, that flows into the north Atlantic Ocean.

Course

The river flows from south to north past the town of Curuçá, Pará.
It is joined from the left by the Furo Maripanema, an arm of the Mocajuba River.
The mangroves along the river are protected by the Mãe Grande de Curuçá Extractive Reserve.

See also
List of rivers of Pará

References

Sources

Rivers of Pará
Tributaries of the Amazon River